Jakub Garbacz (born 17 March 1994) is a Polish basketball player who plays for Stal Ostrów Wielkopolski of the Polish Basketball League. He also plays for the Polish national team.

Professional career
Garbacz was named the PLK Finals MVP in 2021, after leading Stal Ostrów Wielkopolski to its first PLK title.

In the following offseason, he signed in Germany with Mitteldeutscher BC. He averaged 11.9 points and 2.1 rebounds per game. Garbacz signed with Stal Ostrów Wielkopolski on December 31.

References

External links
Jakub Garbacz at Proballers

1994 births
Living people
KKS Pro-Basket Kutno players
Mitteldeutscher BC players
People from Radom
Polish men's basketball players
Stal Ostrów Wielkopolski players